This list of museums in New Jersey is a list of museums, defined for this context as institutions (including nonprofit organizations, government entities, and private businesses) that collect and care for objects of cultural, artistic, scientific, or historical interest and make their collections or related exhibits available for public viewing. Museums that exist only in cyberspace (i.e., virtual museums) are not included.

Lists of New Jersey institutions which are not museums are noted in the "See also" section, below.

List

Defunct museums
 Army Communications, Radar, and Electronics Museum, Fort Monmouth, closed in 2010, collections moved to the United States Army Ordnance Museum at Aberdeen Proving Ground in Maryland 
 Asbury Park Rock 'N Roll Museum, Asbury Park, closed in 2004
 Charles and Anna Hankins Museum, Lavallette, building sold in 2008 and displays moved to Toms River Seaport Society Maritime Museum
 Community Children's Museum, Dover, closed in 2012 
 Flemington Children's Choir School, Flemington
 Johnston Historical Museum, North Brunswick, closed in 1979
 Metz Bicycle Museum, Freehold, website, closed in 2013
 Museum of Natural History at Princeton University, Guyot Hall, Princeton, closed in 2000
 New Jersey Museum of Agriculture, North Brunswick, closed in 2011
 North Pemberton Railroad Station Museum, Pemberton
 Shore Institute for Contemporary Art, Long Branch
 Solitude House Museum (High Bridge) 
 South Jersey Railroad Museum, Tuckahoe
 United States Bicycling Hall of Fame, Bridgewater, moved to California in 2010
 Waterhouse Museum, Toms River
 Wonder Museum, East Windsor

See also
 List of museums
 Nature Centers in New Jersey
 List of zoos in the United_States#New Jersey
 List of aquaria in the United States#New Jersey

References

External links

 New Jersey Tourism: Museums
 League of Historical Societies of New Jersey

Museums
New Jersey
Museums